Moving Violation is the tenth studio album by the Jackson 5 and their final studio album on Motown Records, released on May 15, 1975. Aiming at the developing disco market, the group's funk-based version of Diana Ross & the Supremes' 1968 single "Forever Came Today" was a club hit, while the single's B-side, the R&B ballad "All I Do Is Think of You", became a popular and frequently covered song in its own right.

The album was arranged by Michael Lovesmith, Arthur G. Wright, Dave Blumberg and James Anthony Carmichael, with Lovesmith and John Bahler being responsible for the vocal arrangements. John Kosh was the album cover's designer with photography credited to Jim Britt.

Departure from Motown
After the release of Moving Violation, the brothers left Motown due to the label refusing to let them write their own music and the group earning little album royalties. The only brother to stay with the label was Jermaine, due to the fact that he felt Motown was more capable of promoting Black Music than Sony Records/Epic Records. He was married to Motown CEO Berry Gordy's daughter Hazel at the time.  Jermaine would eventually reunite with his brothers for the Motown 25 television special in 1983, and their 1984 album Victory.

The Jackson 5 left Motown after their contract ended in 1976, but the group had to change their name, since the Jackson 5 moniker was owned by Motown. The brothers later signed with Philadelphia International Records and Epic Records with youngest Jackson brother Randy under their new name, the Jacksons.

Track listing

Side One
 "Forever Came Today" (originally performed by the Supremes) (Holland-Dozier-Holland)  – 6:23
 "Moving Violation" (Liz Shaw, Harold Beatty) – 3:37
 "(You Were Made) Especially for Me" (Michael Lovesmith, Brian Holland) – 3:28
 "Honey Love" (Michael Lovesmith, Edward Holland, Brian Holland) – 4:40

Side Two
 "Body Language (Do the Love Dance)" (Hal Davis, Donald Fletcher) – 4:07
 "All I Do Is Think of You" (Michael Lovesmith, Brian Holland) – 3:17
 "Breezy" (Mel Larson, Jerry Marcellino) – 3:38
 "Call of the Wild" (Mel Larson, Jerry Marcellino) – 2:33
 "Time Explosion" (Mel Larson, Jerry Marcellino) – 4:13

Re-release
In 2001, Motown Records remastered all J5 albums in a "Two Classic Albums/One CD" series (much like they did in the late 1980s). This album was paired up with Dancing Machine. The bonus tracks were the outtakes "Through Thick and Thin" (which appeared on 1976's Joyful Jukebox Music) and the Disc-o-Tech #3 Remix of "Forever Came Today".

Charts

References

Citations

Sources
 
 
 
 

1975 albums
The Jackson 5 albums
Motown albums
Albums produced by Hal Davis
Albums produced by Brian Holland